Defence Metallurgical Research Laboratory (DMRL) is a research laboratory of the Defence Research and Development Organisation (DRDO). Located in Defence Research Complex, Kanchanbagh, Hyderabad. It is responsible for the development and manufacture of complex metals and materials required for modern warfare and weapon systems.

History
As with all the labs of DRDO, DMRL started its operations as a part of the Ordnance Factory Board at its Metal & Steel Factory in Calcutta  in the year 1951 as the Technical Development Establishment (Metals), later to be upgraded as DMRL in 1956. DMRL was shifted to Hyderabad in 1963. Since then, it has developed competence in the areas of powder metallurgy based fabrication and development of alloys, armor and rocket motor steel, aerospace light alloys, and magnetic materials. The formation of other entities such as the Mishra Dhatu Nigam Ltd., Heavy Alloy Penetrator Plant, Composites Production Centre, Non-Ferrous Technology Development Centre, and the Advanced Research Centre International have followed the establishment of DMRL. The DMRL is also involved in R&D efforts to develop futuristic materials to provide advanced technology options.

Projects and products
DMRL has developed:

 DMR 1700 Ultra-high-strength steel with the toughness combination equivalent to maraging steel; this steel has been used to build rocket motor casings for the Akash surface-to-air missiles
 Jackal steel is an advanced grade high strength low alloy steel, The technology of Jackal steel has been passed on to Steel Authority of India Limited (SAIL) and MIDHANI for its bulk production.
 Heavy alloy pre-fragments for Prithvi missile warheads developed for use against aerial targets
 OFE copper for the Nag anti-tank guided missile sheets
 Special magnetic materials such as samarium-cobalt ring magnets and neodymium-iron-boron magnets in collaboration with the Vikram Sarabhai Space Centre for applications in the space program
 Kanchan armour for use on the Arjun tank as well as other armoured vehicles like Sarath and Abhay.
Beta-titanium alloy for aerospace structural forgings.

References

Defence Research and Development Organisation laboratories
Materials science institutes
Research institutes in Hyderabad, India
1963 establishments in Andhra Pradesh